The American Society of Cinematographers Award for Outstanding Achievement in Cinematography in an Episode of a One-Hour Television Series – Commercial is an annual award given by the American Society of Cinematographers to cinematographers working in commercial television. It was first awarded in 2016, when the awards separated it Regular Series award, splitting ad-sponsored television programs and non-sponsored, cable or streaming series into two categories. In 2020, the distinction of "One-Hour" was added, as half-hour programs were given their own categories.

Winners and nominees

1980s

1990s

2000s

2010s

2020s

References

American Society of Cinematographers Awards
Awards for best cinematography